Zalika Reid-Benta is a Canadian writer, whose debut short story collection Frying Plantain has been nominated and won numerous awards.  The book is a collection of linked short stories centering on the coming of age of Kara Davis, a young Jamaican-Canadian girl growing up in the Eglinton West neighbourhood of Toronto, Ontario.

Early life 
Reid-Benta grew up in Toronto.  As a child she enjoyed books written by Judy Blume and movies like Now and Then and My Girl, but she didn't see herself represented in these stories.  Even as a child she knew she wanted to write.

She graduated from the University of Toronto with an Honours BA in English and Cinema studies and with a minor in Caribbean Studies.  She then received an MFA from Columbia University with a concentration in fiction.  In 2017 she attended the Writers Studio at the Banff Center for Arts and Creativity and was a 2019 John Gardener Fiction Fellow at the Bread Loaf Writers Conference.  Prior to the publication of her book, she was mentored by writers Victor LaValle, George Elliott Clarke, Janice Galloway and Olive Senior.

Inspirations 
In a Scotiabank Giller Prize Spotlight interview, Reid-Benta describes Toni Morrison as being one of her literary heroes and mentions that “reading what she does with language, definitely motivates me to write the best way I can.”

When interviewed by Vannessa Barnier, Reid-Benta also describes that Annie John by Jamaica Kincaid, Bastard out of Carolina by Dorothy Allison, and Purple Hibiscus by Chimamanda Ngozi Adiche were inspirations.

Currently, Reid-Benta is writing a "magical realist story" inspired by Jamaican folklore. The main character is a young Black woman having a quarter-life crisis, while adventuring through the streets of Toronto.

Accolades 
Reid-Benta has received several major awards for her work, including:

 2019 Byblacks People’s Choice Awards for Frying Plantain.
 2019 Danuta Gleed Literary Award for Frying Plantain.
 2020 Kobo Emerging Writer Prize for Frying Plantain.

Frying Plantain was shortlisted for the 2020 Toronto Book Awards.  and for the 2020 Trillium Awards.  It was a longlisted nominee for the 2019 Scotia Bank Giller Prize.and it was nominated for the 2021 White Pine Award.

References

21st-century Canadian short story writers
21st-century Canadian women writers
Canadian women short story writers
Black Canadian women
Black Canadian writers
University of Toronto alumni
Columbia University alumni
Writers from Toronto
Living people
Year of birth missing (living people)